Bulburin National Park is a national park in Queensland, Australia, 120 km south of Gladstone and  40 km south-west of Miriam Vale.

Here is the largest remnant of the subtropical rainforest in central Queensland. Diversity of wildlife is represented, including wompoo pigeons, regent bowerbirds, red-necked and red-legged pademelons, red-eyed tree frogs and endangered long-nosed potoroo.

See also

 Protected areas of Queensland

References 

National parks of Central Queensland
Protected areas established in 2015
2015 establishments in Australia